Several ships of the Royal Navy have been named HMS Euryalus after Euryalus, one of Argonauts - the mythical band of heroes who accompanied Jason in his search for the Golden Fleece.

 , launched 1803, was a frigate. Captained by Henry Blackwood, she was at the Battle of Trafalgar, where she was Collingwood's flagship after the death of Nelson. She was broken up in Gibraltar in 1860.
 , launched at Chatham in 1853, was a 2,371-ton wooden screw frigate of 35 guns and crew of 515. 
 , launched in 1877, was a  iron screw corvette, sold in 1897.
 , launched 1901, was a  armoured cruiser that fought at the Dardanelles in World War I. She was scrapped in 1920.
In World War II she was damaged at the Second Battle of Sirte in 1942.

Royal Navy ship names